RNW or rnw may refer to:

 RNW Media, an international non-governmental organisation based in Hilversum, Netherlands
 RNW, the Indian Railways station code for Renwal railway station, Rajasthan, India
 rnw, the ISO 639-3 code for Rungwa language, Tanzania